Mirko Gashi (2 January 1939 – July 1995) was an Albanian writer. Born in Kralje, he studied journalism in Belgrade and worked as a journalist in Flaka e vëllazërimit in Skopje and in Radio Prishtina. He wrote poetry during the 1980s, producing collections Gjarpëri i shtëpise (The House Snake) (1980); Arbor vitae (The Tree of Life) (1988); and Plagë uji, (Water Wound) (1990). Gashi translated literature from Kosovo Albanian authors into Serbo-Croatian. In late years, he suffered from depression and alcoholism, which ended in his death in July 1995.

References

1995 deaths
1939 births
20th-century Albanian writers
Yugoslav writers
20th-century male writers
Albanian journalists
Yugoslav journalists
University of Belgrade Faculty of Philology alumni
People from Kraljevo
Albanians in Serbia
Albanian translators
Yugoslav translators
Albanian–Serbian translators
20th-century translators
20th-century journalists